Grand-Boucan is a commune in the Baradères Arrondissement, in the Nippes department of Haiti.

References

Populated places in Nippes
Communes of Haiti